The Mpumalanga women's cricket team is the women's representative cricket team for the South African province of Mpumalanga. They compete in the Women's Provincial Programme and the CSA Women's Provincial T20 Competition.

History
Mpumalanga Women joined the South African domestic system in the 2004–05 season, competing in the Women's Provincial League. In their first season, they finished bottom of their group of four, losing all six of their matches. They have competed in the tournament ever since, but have never made it out of the initial group stage. The side has also competed in the CSA Women's Provincial T20 Competition since its inception in 2012–13, but have again never made it out of the initial group stages.  Their best performances have come in recent seasons, winning three of their four matches in both the 2018–19 and 2019–20 tournaments.

Players

Current squad
Based on appearances in the 2021–22 season. Players in bold have international caps.

Notable players
Players who have played for Mpumalanga and played internationally are listed below, in order of first international appearance (given in brackets):

  Lizelle Lee (2013)

See also
 Mpumalanga (cricket team)

References

Women's cricket teams in South Africa
Cricket in Mpumalanga